Cochylimorpha arenosana is a species of moth of the family Tortricidae. It is found in northern Mongolia and Tuva, Russia. The habitat consists of sand dunes.

References

Moths described in 1998
Cochylimorpha
Moths of Asia